East Kola'a Ridge is a suburb of Honiara, Solomon Islands and is located east of Chinatown.

References

Populated places in Guadalcanal Province
Suburbs of Honiara